Aristida purpurascens is a species of grass known by the common name arrowfeather threeawn. It is native to eastern North America. One of the three varieties has a distribution extending south into Honduras.

Description
This perennial bunchgrass produces stems up to 100 centimeters tall. It lacks rhizomes. The leaf blades are hairless, pale green, and up to 25 centimeters in length. They may become curly with age. The panicle-shaped inflorescence has branches appressed to the stem, making it narrow. The awns may be up to 2.5 centimeters in length.

This plant may be grazed when young but as it ages it becomes low in quality and even dangerous for livestock because of the sharp spikelets.

References

External links
USDA Plants Profile — Aristida purpurascens (arrowfeather threeawn)
Grass Manual on the Web: Aristida purpurascens — species and varieties treatments.

purpurascens
Bunchgrasses of North America
Flora of Honduras